Seth Lewis is a Republican member of the Illinois House of Representatives from the 45th district. The 45th district, located in the Chicago area, includes all or parts of Addison, Bartlett, Bloomingdale, Carol Stream, Elk Grove Village, Hanover Park, Itasca, Roselle, Streamwood, Wayne, West Chicago, and Wood Dale.

Electoral career
Lewis began his career in public service as a Bartlett Fire Protection District Trustee. Lewis later ran for Illinois State Senate in the 23rd district in 2016 and 2018, but lost both elections to incumbent Tom Cullerton.

In 2020, Lewis announced that he would be running against incumbent Diane Pappas in Illinois' 45th House District. Lewis defeated Pappas in the general election with 53% of the vote.

Illinois House of Representatives

Committees
Currently, Lewis serves on seven committees and one subcommittee: the Transportation: Regulation, Roads committee, the Labor & Commerce committee, the Judiciary - Civil committee, the International Trade & Commerce committee, the Consumer Protection committee, the Appropriations-Human Services committee, the Civil Procedure & Tort Liability committee, and the Wage Policy & Study subcommittee.

Legislation
As of 2022, one bill with Lewis listed as the Primary Sponsor has gone on to become law in Illinois: HB2109. This legislation amended the Illinois Insurance Code to require individual and group accident and health insurers to cover "medically necessary comprehensive cancer testing and testing of blood or constitutional tissue for cancer predisposition testing as determined by a physician."

Personal life
Lewis has been married to Dr. Bhavna Sharma-Lewis since 1997, with whom he has two children. Sharma-Lewis currently serves as superintendent of Diamond Lake School District 76. He has lived in Bartlett, Illinois since 2001.

Electoral history

References

External links

21st-century American politicians
Illinois Republicans
Living people
University of Iowa alumni
Year of birth missing (living people)